is a railway station in Moriyama-ku, Nagoya, Aichi Prefecture,  Japan, operated by Meitetsu.

Lines

Station layout
The station has two elevated opposed side platforms with the station building underneath. The station has automated ticket machines, Manaca automated turnstiles and is unattended..

Platforms

Adjacent stations

|-
!colspan=5|Nagoya Railroad

Station history
The Seto Electric Railway was absorbed into the Meitetsu group on September 1, 1939. The station was renamed to its present name on November 14, 1992.

Passenger statistics
In fiscal 2017, the station was used by an average of 6495 passengers daily.

Surrounding area
Kinjo Gakuin University
 Ōmori Junior High School
 Ōmori Elementary School

See also
 List of Railway Stations in Japan

References

External links

 Official web page 

Railway stations in Japan opened in 1905
Railway stations in Aichi Prefecture
Stations of Nagoya Railroad
Railway stations in Nagoya